Dietwiller is a commune in the Haut-Rhin department in Alsace in eastern France. It forms part of the Mulhouse Alsace Agglomération, the inter-communal local government body for the Mulhouse conurbation.

History 
The Thalbahn Habsheim ran through Dietwiller. It was built during World War I by German soldiers and Romanian prisoners of war as a military light railway. Many prisoners of war died due to malnutrition, forced labor and the poor living conditions and were buried in the Romanian cemetery in Dietweiler.

See also
 Communes of the Haut-Rhin department

References

Communes of Haut-Rhin